Dean L. Urdahl (born August 18, 1949) is an American politician serving in the Minnesota House of Representatives since 2003. A member of the Republican Party of Minnesota, Urdahl represents District 16A in central Minnesota, which includes the cities of Litchfield and Montevideo, Renville County, and parts of Chippewa, Kandiyohi, and Meeker Counties. He is a retired teacher and coach.

Early life, education, and career
Urdahl grew up in Litchfield, Minnesota. His roots run deep in the area: his ancestors helped settle Litchfield Township in 1856. He graduated from Litchfield High School and St. Cloud State University, earning a B.S. in social studies. He got his start in politics working on U.S. Representative John Zwach's campaign staff in 1970.

Urdahl was an American history teacher and coach in the New London-Spicer School District from 1971 to 2006. He has served on the Minnesota Education in Agriculture Leadership Council, the Minnesota Commission on Public Service Reform, and the Minnesota State Board of Nursing. In July 2008, he was appointed as the Minnesota representative to the Abraham Lincoln Bicentennial Commission. In 2012 Urdahl was named co-chair of the Minnesota Civil War Sesquicentennial Task Force.

Urdahl has written a book about former members of the Minnesota Twins baseball team and another about famous Minnesotans. He has written four books of historical fiction set in Minnesota during the Dakota War of 1862. Urdahl also wrote two historical novels about Minnesota's soldiers in the American Civil War, concentrating on the war's western theater.

Urdahl married Karen Frantti in 1971. They have three sons and 11 grandchildren.

Minnesota House of Representatives
Urdahl ran as the Independent-Republican Party candidate for the Minnesota House of Representatives District 15B in 1992 and 1994, losing to incumbent Roger Cooper. In 1996, he ran in the Republican primary for District 15B, losing to Drew Hultgren.

Urdahl was elected to the House in 2002, after incumbent Gary Kubly retired, and has been reelected every two years since. In 2011-12 and 2015-16 he chaired the Legacy Division, which oversees funds raised by the Clean Water, Land and Legacy Amendment to the Minnesota Constitution. During the 2017-18 legislative session, Urdahl chaired the Capital Investment Committee. He serves as the minority lead on the Capital Investment Committee and sits on the Education Policy Committee.

Urdahl was instrumental in obtaining funding for the Minnesota State Capitol restoration and was named to serve on the Capitol Restoration Commission his committee established.

Electoral history

References

External links

 Rep. Urdahl Web Page
 Minnesota Public Radio Votetracker: Rep. Dean Urdahl
 Project Votesmart - Rep. Dean Urdahl Profile
 Dean Urdahl Campaign Web Site

1949 births
Living people
People from Meeker County, Minnesota
Republican Party members of the Minnesota House of Representatives
American Lutherans
American male writers
21st-century American politicians